Spring equinox or vernal equinox or variations may refer to: 

 March equinox, the spring equinox in the Northern Hemisphere
 September equinox, the spring equinox in the Southern Hemisphere

Other uses
 Nowruz, Persian/Iranian new year which begins on the spring equinox (March equinox)
 Vernal Equinox Day, a holiday in Japan (in March)
 Spring Equinox: Moon's Milk or Under an Unquiet Skull, a 1998 EP by Coil
 Vernal Equinox (album), by Jon Hassell, 1977
 "Vernal Equinox", a song by Can from the 1975 album Landed

See also

Equinox (disambiguation)
Equinox (celestial coordinates)
 Autumnal equinox (disambiguation)
 Winter solstice (disambiguation)
 Summer solstice (disambiguation)